Marie-Antoinette Lix (31 May 1839 – 14 January 1909) was a French governess and heroine of the 1863–64 January Uprising against Russia who later fought in the Franco-Prussian War.

Lix was born in Colmar, Haut-Rhin, Alsace, France to François-Antoine Lix and Françoise Schmitt. She was given a full military education by her father, who later sent her to Sisters of Divine Providence in Ribeauvillé to be further educated. After graduating as a teacher, she became a governess with a Polish noble family in Szycz. She joined the Polish insurrection against Russia in 1863, acted as a courier on the side of the Polish rebels, but was captured by the Russians and then released. She returned to France in 1866.

Following the Battle of Sedan (1870) in the Franco-Prussian War, Lix joined the French Army under General Pierre de Failly. She was a sniper in Lamarche as a lieutenant before joining General Albert Cambriels' troops. She participated in the defense of Vosges and the city of Langres, and distinguished herself during the Battle of Nompatelize on 6 October 1870.

She died in 1909 in Saint-Nicolas-de-Port, Meurthe-et-Moselle. In 1910, an organisation of women of Strasbourg and Colmar donated a silver sword in her honour to the Musée de l'Armée in Paris.

References

1839 births
1909 deaths
19th-century French educators
19th-century women educators
French expatriates in the Russian Empire
French governesses
January Uprising participants
People from Colmar
Women in 19th-century warfare
Women in European warfare